The 2009–10 Maltese First Division Knock-Out was a knockout tournament for Maltese football clubs playing in the First Division. The competition was held between 20 September 2009 and 14 May 2010, with the winners being Marsaxlokk.

Group stage

Group 1

Group 2

Knockout phase

Semi-finals

|colspan="3" style="background:#fcc;"|8 May 2010

|}

Final

|colspan="3" style="background:#fcc;"|14 May 2010

|}

See also
 2009–10 Maltese First Division

References

Maltese First Division knock-out
knock-out